Küstenwache is a German television series that tells the fictionalized adventures of a unit of the Federal Coast Guard, off the German coast of the Baltic Sea. It aired on ZDF for seventeen seasons from 1997 to 2016.

External links
 

German crime television series
1997 German television series debuts
2000s German television series
2010s German television series
Nautical television series
ZDF original programming
German-language television shows